Edith Thornton (1896–1984) was an American film actress of the silent era. She was married to the actor Charles Hutchison, appearing with him in several films and serials.

Selected filmography

 The Better Woman (1915)
 It May Be Your Daughter (1916)
 The Great Gamble (1919)
 Hurricane Hutch in Many Adventures (1924)
 Surging Seas (1924)
 On Probation (1924)
 Virtue's Revolt (1924)
 Poison (1924)
 Hutch of the U.S.A. (1924)
 Fair Play (1925)
 Was It Bigamy? (1925)
 Lightning Hutch (1926)
 The Little Firebrand (1926)
 The Mystic Hour (1933)

References

Bibliography
 Katchmer, George A. A Biographical Dictionary of Silent Film Western Actors and Actresses. McFarland, 2015.
 Langman, Larry. American Film Cycles: The Silent Era. Greenwood Publishing, 1998.

External links

1896 births
1984 deaths
American film actresses
Actresses from New York City
20th-century American actresses